The Socialist Republic of the Union of Burma, known as the Union of Burma from 1962 to 1974, was the Burmese state under the military dictatorship of Ne Win from 1962 to 1988. It was established by the Union Revolutionary Council (RC), the military junta founded by Ne Win and his allies in the Tatmadaw (Burmese military) after they overthrew the democratically elected government of Prime Minister U Nu in a coup d'état on 2 March 1962.

Following the 1962 coup d'état, the RC made the Burmese Way to Socialism Burma's state ideology. Ne Win then founded the Burma Socialist Programme Party (BSPP) as the country's vanguard party on 4 July 1962. For the next 26 years, Ne Win ruled Burma as a dictator, serving as both Chairman of the BSPP (later President of Burma) and Prime Minister of Burma, the country's head of state and the head of government, respectively. Ne Win's governance of Burma was characterised by isolationism, totalitarianism, superstition, xenophobia, and a rejection of Cold War politics.

Mass pro-democracy protests in 1988, popularly known as the 8888 Uprising, pressured BSPP officials, including Ne Win, to resign en masse and adopt a multi-party system. However, on 18 September 1988, the Tatmadaw staged a coup d'état against the BSPP, violently ended the protests, and established a new military junta, the State Law and Order Restoration Council (SLORC).

Background 
Burma under Prime Minister U Nu and the AFPFL-led coalition government in the Union Parliament had implemented left-wing economic and welfare policies, although economic growth remained slow throughout the 1950s. By 1958, Burma was largely beginning to recover economically, but was beginning to fall apart politically due to a split in the ruling AFPFL into two factions: the Clean AFPFL led by U Nu and Thakin Tin, and the Stable AFPFL led by Ba Swe and Kyaw Nyein. This situation persisted despite the unexpected success of U Nu's "Arms for Democracy" offer taken up by U Seinda in the Arakan, the Pa-O, some Mon and Shan groups, but more significantly by the PVO surrendering their arms. The Union Parliament became very unstable, with U Nu barely surviving a no-confidence vote only with the support of the opposition National United Front (NUF), believed to have crypto-communists amongst them. Hardliners in the Tatmadaw viewed this as a threat of the Communist Party of Burma (CPB) coming to an agreement with U Nu through the NUF, and resulted in U Nu inviting General Ne Win, the Army Chief of Staff, to serve as interim prime minister to restore order in Burma. Over 400 "communist sympathizers" were arrested, of which 153 were deported to a penal colony on Great Coco Island in the Andaman Sea. Among them was the NUF leader Aung Than, older brother of Aung San. Newspapers like Botahtaung, Kyemon and Rangoon Daily were also closed down.

On 28 October 1958, Ne Win staged an internal coup d'état under the auspices of U Nu and successfully restored Burma's political stability, a period known as the "Ne Win caretaker government", until the February 1960 general election which returned U Nu's Clean AFPFL, renamed as the Union Party, with a large majority. Ne Win officially handed back power to the victorious U Nu on 4 April 1960. However, the situation in Burma did not remain stable for long due to petitions from the Shan federalist movement started by Sao Shwe Thaik, the first President of Burma from 1948 to 1952 and the Saopha of Nyaung Shwe. The Shan federalists were aspiring to create a "loose" federation in Burma, and were seen as a separatist movement for insisting on the Burmese government honouring the right to secession in 10 years provided for by the 1947 Constitution. Ne Win had already succeeded in stripping the Shan Saopha of their feudal powers in exchange for comfortable pensions for life in 1959, but the unresolved issues of federalism and social order continued.

History

1962 Burmese coup d'état 

The elected civilian government had lost most of its legitimacy by 1962; the Burmese public perceived it as corrupt, inept at ruling the country, and unable to restore law and order. Meanwhile, the Tatmadaw rose in popularity thanks to the stability created by Ne Win's caretaker government. Burma also faced various economic, religious, and political crises, particularly the ethnic-based insurgencies in the country's peripheries and the issues of federalism and separatism. Less than two years after returning to civilian rule, Ne Win launched a second military-backed coup d'état on 2 March 1962, this time without U Nu's blessing.

The coup succeeded with little bloodshed and its instigators established the Union Revolutionary Council (URC) to replace the Union Parliament as Burma's supreme governing body. In April 1962, the URC declared Burma a socialist state and announced the "Burmese Way to Socialism" as a blueprint for economic development, decreasing foreign influence in Burma to zero per cent, and increasing the role of the military in politics. The URC also founded the Burma Socialist Programme Party (BSPP) on 4 July 1962 to nominally separate the powers of the military from the government. However, the BSPP's leadership was dominated by military officials for all of its history, although the party did make attempts to transition into a mass party, such as the replacement of the URC with the People's Assembly in 1974.

Failure of the Burmese Way to Socialism 
The implementation of the Burmese Way to Socialism negatively affected the economy, educational standards, and living standards of the Burmese people. Foreign aid organisations, like the American-based Ford Foundation and Asia Foundation, as well as the World Bank, were no longer allowed to operate in the country. Only permitted was aid from a government-to-government basis. In addition, the teaching of the English language was reformed and moved to secondary schools, whereas previously it had started as early as kindergarten. The government also implemented extensive visa restrictions for Burmese citizens, especially when their destinations were Western countries. Instead, the government sponsored the travel of students, scientists and technicians to the Soviet Union and Eastern Europe, in order to receive training and to "counter years of Western influence" in the country. Similarly, visas for foreigners were limited to just 24 hours.

Furthermore, freedom of expression and the freedom of the press was extensively restricted. Foreign language publications were prohibited, as were newspapers that printed "false propagandist news." The Press Scrutiny Board (now the Press Scrutiny and Registration Division), which censors all publications to this day, including newspapers, journals, advertisements and cartoons, was established by the RC through the Printers' and Publishers' Registration Act in August 1962.  The RC set up the News Agency of Burma (BNA) to serve as a news distribution service in the country, thus effectively replacing the work of foreign news agencies. In September 1963, The Vanguard and The Guardian, two Burmese newspapers, were nationalised. In December 1965, publication of privately owned newspapers was banned by the government.

The impact on the Burmese economy was extensive. The Enterprise Nationalization Law, passed by the Revolutionary Council in 1963, nationalised all major industries, including import-export trade, rice, banking, mining, teak and rubber on 1 June 1963. In total, around 15,000 private firms were nationalised. Furthermore, industrialists were prohibited from establishing new factories with private capital. This was particularly detrimental to the Anglo-Burmese, Burmese Indians and the British, who were disproportionately represented in these industries.

The oil industry, which was previously controlled by American and British companies, such as the General Exploration Company and East Asiatic Burma Oil, were forced to end operations. In its place was the government-owned Burma Oil Company, which monopolised oil extraction and production. In August 1963, the nationalisation of basic industries, including department stores, warehouses and wholesale shops, followed. Price control boards were also introduced.

The Enterprise Nationalization Law directly affected foreigners in Burma, particularly Burmese Indians and the Burmese Chinese, both of whom had been influential in the economic sector as entrepreneurs and industrialists. By mid-1963, 2,500 foreigners a week were leaving Burma. By September 1964, approximately 100,000 Indian nationals had left the country.

The black market became a major feature of Burmese society, representing about 80% of the national economy during the Burmese Way period. Moreover, income disparity became a major socioeconomic issue. Throughout the 1960s, Burma's foreign exchange reserves declined from $214 million in 1964 to $50 million in 1971, while inflation skyrocketed. Rice exports also declined, from 1,840,000 tons in 1961-62 to 350,000 tons in 1967-68, the result of the inability of rice production to satisfy demand caused by high population growth rates.

In the First Burmese Socialist Programme Party (BSPP) Congress in 1971, several minor economic reforms were made, in light of the failures of the economic policy pursued throughout the 1960s. The Burmese government asked to rejoin the World Bank, joined the Asian Development Bank, and sought more foreign aid and assistance. The "Twenty-year plan", an economic plan divided into five increments of implementation, was introduced, in order to develop the country's natural resources, including agriculture, forestry, oil and natural gas, through state development. These reforms brought living standards back to pre-World War II levels and stimulated economic growth. However, by 1988, foreign debt had ballooned to $4.9 billion, about three-fourths of the national GDP, and Ne Win's later attempt to make the Kyat based in denominations divisible by 9, a number he considered to be auspicious, led to the wiping of millions of savings of the Burmese people, resulting in the 8888 Uprising.

The Burmese Way to Socialism has largely been described by scholars as an "abject failure" which turned one of the most prosperous countries in Asia into one of the world's poorest. Burma experienced greatly increased poverty, inequality, corruption  and international isolation, and has been described as "disastrous". Burma's real per capita GDP increased from US$159.18 in 1962 to US$219.20 in 1987, or about 1.3% per year, one of the weakest growth rates in East Asia over this period, but still positive. The program also may have served to increase domestic stability and keep Burma from being as entangled in the Cold War struggles that affected other Southeast Asian nations.

Notes

References

Citations

Sources

Books

Journal articles

Other 

 Burma—Growing Ever Darker Foreign Policy in Focus, 11 September 2007.

External links
 "The Burmese Way to Socialism" by the Union Revolutionary Council

 
Former countries in Burmese history
1960s in Burma
1962 in Burma
1970s in Burma
1980s in Myanmar
1988 in Burma
1960s establishments in Burma
1988 disestablishments in Burma
20th century in Myanmar
Burma
History of Myanmar
Military dictatorships
Burma
Burma
Burma